Birches, Betula species, are used as food plants by the larvae of a large number of Lepidoptera species including:

Monophagous
Species which feed exclusively on Betula

 Bucculatricidae leaf-miners:
 Bucculatrix canadensisella
 Bucculatrix coronatella
 Coleophoridae
 Several Coleophora case-bearer species:
 C. betulella – only known from silver birch (B. pendula) and downy birch (B. pubescens)
 C. cornuta
 C. hornigi
 C. lentella
 C. milvipennis
 Notodontidae
 Leucodonta bicoloria (white prominent)

Polyphagous
Species which feed on Betula and other plants

 Bedelliidae
 Bedellia somnulentella – recorded on paper birch (B. papyrifera)
 Bucculatricidae
 Bucculatrix demaryella
 Coleophoridae
 Several Coleophora case-bearer species:
 C. albovanescens
 C. anatipennella
 C. binderella
 C. comptoniella
 C. fuscedinella
 C. fuscocuprella
 C. ibipennella
 C. malivorella
 C. orbitella
 C. persimplexella
 C. piperata – recorded on red birch (B. occidentalis)
 C. potentillae
 C. pruniella
 C. serratella
 C. siccifolia
 Endromidae
 Endromis versicolora
 Drepanidae
 Drepana binaria (oak hook-tip)
 Gelechiidae
 Chionodes viduella
 Geometridae
 Agriopis marginaria (dotted border)
 Alcis repandata (mottled beauty)
 Biston betularia (peppered moth)
 Biston strataria (oak beauty)
 Cabera exanthemata (common wave)
 Cabera pusaria (common white wave)
 Campaea margaritata (light emerald)
 Chloroclysta truncata (common marbled carpet)
 Colotois pennaria (feathered thorn)
 Crocallis elinguaria (scalloped oak)
 Ectropis crepuscularia (engrailed)
 Epirrita autumnata (autumnal moth)
 Epirrita christyi (pale November moth)
 Epirrita dilutata (November moth)
 Erannis defoliaria (mottled umber)
 Eupithecia subfuscata (grey pug)
 Geometra papilionaria (large emerald)
 Hemithea aestivaria (common emerald)
 Lomaspilis marginata (clouded border)
 Odontopera bidentata (scalloped hazel)
 Operophtera brumata (winter moth)
 Opisthograptis luteolata (brimstone moth)
 Peribatodes rhomboidaria (willow beauty) – leaves
 Selenia tetralunaria (purple thorn)
 Hepialidae
 Gazoryctra wielgusi
 Korscheltellus gracilis (conifer swift)
 Sthenopis argenteomaculatus
 Lymantriidae
 Euproctis chrysorrhoea (brown-tail)
 Euproctis similis (yellow-tail)
 Lymantria dispar (gypsy moth) – recorded on paper birch (B. papyrifera) and gray birch (B. populifolia)
 Noctuidae
 Acronicta leporina (miller)
 Acronicta psi (grey dagger)
 Acronicta tridens (dark dagger)
 Cosmia trapezina (dun-bar)
 Euplexia lucipara (small angle shades)
 Eupsilia transversa (satellite)
 Melanchra persicariae (dot moth) – recorded on silver birch (B. pendula)
 Noctua comes (lesser yellow underwing)
 Orthosia gothica (Hebrew character)
 Panolis flammea (pine beauty)
 Phlogophora meticulosa (angle shades)
 Xestia triangulum (double square-spot)
 Notodontidae
 Nadata gibbosa (rough prominent)
 Phalera bucephala (buff-tip)
 Ptilodon capucina (coxcomb prominent)
 Nymphalidae
 Limenitis arthemis (American white admiral/red-spotted purple) – prefers sweet birch (B. lenta) over yellow birch (B. alleghaniensis)
 Saturniidae
Actias luna (luna moth)
Pavonia pavonia (emperor moth)
 Sphingidae
 Ceratomia amyntor (elm sphinx)
 Laothoe populi (poplar hawk-moth)
 Mimas tiliae (lime hawk-moth)
 Smerinthus jamaicensis (twin-spotted sphinx)
 Tortricidae
 Syndemis musculana

External links

Birches
Lepidoptera